Herbal Research and Development Institute (also HRDI) in Gopeshwar, Uttarakhand, is a government-run research institute founded in 1989 that conserves and studies medicinal herbs found in abundance in the upper regions of Uttarakhand. 18,000 plant species have been identified in the state, and about 1,800 of those are considered to be of medicinal value. Herbs, which are mentioned in Ayurvedic classical texts, continue to play a vital role in the region and are used by traditional local healers for ailments that can usually be cured with modern medicine.

References

External links 

Traditional medicine in India
Research institutes in Uttarakhand
Research institutes established in 1989
Education in Chamoli district
1989 establishments in Uttar Pradesh